Joe Hipkin (8 August 1900 – 11 February 1957), full name Augustus Bernard Hipkin, was an English cricketer. He played for Essex between 1923 and 1931. After his retirement from cricket, he became a security officer.

References

External links

1900 births
1957 deaths
English cricketers
Essex cricketers
People from Brancaster
English cricketers of 1919 to 1945
H. D. G. Leveson Gower's XI cricketers